The 2011 Open GDF Suez de Biarritz was a professional tennis tournament played on outdoor clay courts. It was part of the 2011 ITF Women's Circuit. It took place in Biarritz, France between July 4 and July 10, 2011.  The singles championship was won by Pauline Parmentier and the doubles championship was won by Alexandra Panova and Urszula Radwańska.

WTA entrants

Seeds

Rankings are as of June 20, 2011.

Other entrants
The following players received wildcards into the singles main draw:
  Maria Elena Camerin
  Jessica Ginier
  Kristina Mladenovic
  Nathalie Piquion

The following players received entry from the qualifying draw:
  Vlada Ekshibarova
  Inés Ferrer-Suárez
  Maria João Koehler
  Roxane Vaisemberg

Champions

Singles

 Pauline Parmentier def.  Patricia Mayr-Achleitner, 1–6, 6–4, 6–4

Doubles

 Alexandra Panova /  Urszula Radwańska def.  Erika Sema /  Roxane Vaisemberg, 6–2, 6–1

References
Official Website
ITF Search

Notes

Open GDF Suez de Biarritz
Open de Biarritz
Open GDF Suez de Biarritz